Landry Nanan Houssou (born 28 December 2000) is an Ivorian professional footballer who plays as a midfielder for Loudoun United, on loan from ASI D'Abengourou.

Career

ASI D'Abengourou
Houssou scored seven goals and recorded 16 assists in 20 appearances for MTN Ligue 1 side ASI D'Abengourou in the 2019-20 season. On 19 February 2021, he moved to the United States on a loan deal with USL Championship side Loudoun United.

Career statistics

Club

Notes

References

2000 births
Living people
Ivorian footballers
Ivory Coast youth international footballers
Ivorian expatriate footballers
Association football midfielders
USL Championship players
AS Indenié Abengourou players
Loudoun United FC players
Ivorian expatriate sportspeople in the United States
Expatriate soccer players in the United States